Sankt Annæ Gade 2022 is a complex  of Neoclassical buildings situated at the corner of Sankt Annæ Gade and Christianshavns Kanal in the Christianshavn neighborhood of central Copenhagen, Denmark. A distillery was for more than one hundred yearsfrom at least the 1750s until at least the 1860s operated on the site. The current complex consists of a corner building from 1804, flanked by two just two-bays-wide older buildings, both of which were adapted in connection with the construction of the corner building. The entire complex was jointly listed in the Danish registry of protected buildings and places in 1950. The courtyard on the rear was redesigned by landscape architect Jeppe Aagaard Andersen in the 1980s.

History

18th century

The site was part of two separate properties in the late 17th century. The corner property was listed as No. 85 in Copenhagen's first cadastre of 1689 and was at that time owned by Jørgen Jensen. The adjacent property in Sankt Annæ Gade was listed as No. 84 and belonged to joiner Thomas Pedersen. The old No. 85 was some time later divided into two properties. The new and smaller corner property was listed as No. 149 in the new cadastre of 1756 and was at that time owned by distiller   Anders Andersen Jennum. The small adjacent property in Sankt Annæ Gade was listed as No. 148 and belonged to Jørgen Christensen. The next property in Sankt Annæ Gade was listed as No. 147 (formerly part of No. 84) and belonged to ship carpenter Otte Olsen.

No. 149 was home to 12 residents in four households at the 1787 census. Søren Truelsen. a distiller, resided in the building with his wife Kirstine Hans Datter, their eight-year-old daughter Andrea, a caretaker and a maid. Peder Lund, a tobacco merchant, resided in the building with his wife Karen and one maid. Christen Ipsen, a workman employed by the Danish East Asia Company, resided in the building with his wife Kirstine and two lodgers (both smiths). Bold Iverts, a 72-year-old widow, resided in the building with one lodger (smith). No. 148 was home to 23 residents in six households. Bøye Gabriel Lind, a clerk employed by the Danish Asiatic Company, resided in the building with his wife Mette Catrine, their one-year-old daughter Sophie Hedvig and one maid. Sørn Pedersen, a ship carpenter, resided in the building with his wife Anne Niels Datter, their three children (aged one to eight) and two lodgers (ship carpenters). Ole Hanssen, a 52-year-old man (no occupation mentioned in the census records), resided in the building with his wife Elsse Mariem, their one-year-old son Hans Hartvig and the wife's mother Bold Hartvigs. Anders Olssen, a sailor, resided in the building with his wife Elen Niels Datter. Jens Moths Jenwildmand, a klein smith, resided in the building with his wife Sesilige Sophie, their one-year-old daughter and a 10-year-old son from the wife's first marriage. Christen Schausgaar, a ship carpenter, resided in the building with his wife Magreta Jens Datter.

No. 147 was home to 17 residents in seven households at the 1787 census. Sivert Holm, a ship worker, resided in the building with his wife Tone. Anders Sørnsen, a sailor, resided in the building with his wife Anne Marie. Lene Christens, a 73-year-old widow, resided in the building alone. Hans Croier, a boatman, resided in the building with his wife Sophie. Karen Marie, a 74-year-old widow, resided in the building alone. Christen Andersen, a ship carpenter, resided in the building with his wife Mette and their three-year-old son. Lorentz Christiansen, a workman and former soldier, resided in the building with their three children (aged two to six).

19th century
Bo. 149 was again home to 16 residents in three households at the 1801 census. Knud Petersen Holst, a new brewer and distiller, resided in the building with his wife Marie Clausen, their two children (aged three and 10), a caretaker, a maid and a lodger (naval lieutenant). Iver Olsen, a workman, resided in the building with his wife Karen Ivers and four lodgers. Another workman, Christen Christensen, resided in the building with his wife Anne Marie Hansdatter and their eight-year-old son.

No. 148 was home to 29 residents in eight households. Andreas Petersen, an innkeeper, resided in the building with his wife Gundel Strandberg, their four children (aged nine to 14) and the 75-year-old widow Gudman Dahl. The remaining residents included four workmen, a sailor, a watchman and a cooper.

No. 147 was home to 15 residents in four households. Sigvart Holm, now an innkeeper, resided in the building with his wife Børge Olsen and two lodgers. Hans Jørgen, a ship carpenter, resided in the building with his wife Maria Hansdatter and their one-year-old daughter. Christen Amundsen, a ship carpenter, resided in the building with his wife Mette Hansdatter, their 10-year-old son and three lodgers. The last resident, Andreas Eskildsen, was a 50-year-old workman.

No. 148 and No. 149 were later merged into a single property. The present corner building on the site was constructed in 1804. The property was listed as No. 144 in the new cadastre of 1806. It was at that time owned by distiller Nikolaj Bertelsen. The old No. 147 was listed as No. 143 and was then owned by ship carpenter Otte Olsen.

No. 144 was home to 29 residents in eight households at the time of the 1840 census. Maren Jacobsen, a widow distiller, resided on the ground floor with two daughters (aged 20 and 22) and three male employees. Nicolei Lose, a helmsman, resided on the first floor with his wife Gustine Dorethea Lose, a 13-year-old boy in their care (dead father and mother in Norway) and one maid. Peter A. Petersen, another helmsman, resided on the second floor with his wife Dorthea Petersen. Jens Henrich Curtz, a bookkeeper at Generalpostdirectonen, resided on the second floor with his wife Caroline Thomassine Jacobsen and one maid. Ane Margrethe Rønnov, a schoolmistress (widow), resided on the third floor with her 15-year-old daughter. Henriette Bakke, a 35-year-old widow needleworker, resided in the other third floor apartment with her two sons (aged one and 10). Andreas Peter Norøe, a helmsman, resided on the third floor with his wife Ellen Christine Bentzen, their two children (aged two and five) and one lodger (a sailor). Hans Frederiksen, a workman, resided on the third floor with his wife Emilie Lovise Johnsen, their two-year-old daughter and one lodger.

No. 143 was home to four households at the time of the 1840 census. Hans Jensen, a tavern owner, resided on the ground floor with his wife Anne Florentine Kamensky and their 11-year-old daughter. Ane Kirstine Hansen Harberg, a 57-year-old widow employed with needlework, resided on the second floor with two of her sons (aged 17 and 21). Peter Christian Lund, a workman, resided on the first floor of the rear wing with his wife Karen Kirstine Hansen and his sister Severine Lund. Karen Kirstine Schults, a seamstress and laundrywoman, resided on the second floor of the rear wing with her daughter and a lodger.

In 1859, No. 143 and No. 144 were merged into a single property as No. 143 & 144. House numbering by street was that same year introduced in Copenhagen as a supplement to the old cadastre numbers by quarter. The complex was in this connection listed as Sankt Ann' Gade 2022.

The distillery was owned by distiller Carl Jacobsen in 1860. He resided in the building with his wife Ingeborg Maria Jacobsen, a 22-year-old female floor clerk, three male employees and two maids.

Architecture
The entire complex is constructed with four storeys over a walk-out basement. Sankt Annæ Gade 22 has a nine-bays-long facade on Sankt Annæ Gade, a two-bays-long facade on Overgaden and a slightly recessed bow-shaped corner bay. The ground floor of the facade is plastered and painted grey while the upper floors are left with undressed, yellow brick. Decorative elements include a sandstone band above the ground floor, recessed Greek key friezes between the windows of the first and second floors and a white-painted cornice. The corner building is towards both streets flanked by two-bay buildings with plastered, white-painted facades. The narrow building in Sankt Annæ Gade is a former townhouse and the one in Overgaden is a former warehouse. The two buildings were both adapted in connection with the construction of the corner building. The pitched, red tile roof features a total of seven dormer windows towards the street.

Today
The property is owned by Lotte Hartmann. It contains a shop on the ground floor and two apartments on each of the upper floors.

See also
 Kringlegangen

References

External links

 Source

Listed residential buildings in Copenhagen
Distilleries in Copenhagen
Buildings and structures in Christianshavn
Residential buildings completed in 1804